Echinanthera undulata  is a species of snake of the family Colubridae. The species is found in Brazil, Ecuador, and Colombia.

References

Echinanthera
Reptiles of Brazil
Reptiles of Ecuador
Reptiles of Colombia
Reptiles described in 1824
Taxa named by Prince Maximilian of Wied-Neuwied